Wong Mo Ying is a village in the Tai Mong Tsai area of Sai Kung District, Hong Kong.

Wong Mo Ying is a Hakka village which was populated by inhabitants with the surname Tang, originally from Danshui of Huizhou, who settled in Wong Mo Ying probably between the 1750s and the 1840s.

Wong Mo Ying is a recognized village under the New Territories Small House Policy.

The Rosary Mission Centre is a chapel built in 1940 in Wong Mo Ying. On February 3, 1942, the Hong Kong-Kowloon Independent Battalion under the People's Anti-Japanese Principal Guerrilla Force of Guangdong, or Dongjiang Guerrilla Force, was established in Wong Mo Ying Church. The chapel is listed as a Grade II historic building.

References

External links

 Delineation of area of existing village Wong Mo Ying (Sai Kung) for election of resident representative (2019 to 2022)
 Pictures of Rosary Mission Centre:  

Villages in Sai Kung District, Hong Kong